Elizabeth Fraser (born 1963) is a Scottish singer, songwriter and musician.

Elizabeth Fraser may also refer to:
Elisabeth Fraser (1920–2005), American actress
Elizabeth Fraser (swimmer) (born 1941), Australian swimmer
Elizabeth Bertha Fraser (born 1914), British artist
Liz Fraser (1930–2018), British actress